The Militärgeschichtliche Zeitschrift (English: Military History Journal) is a biannual peer-reviewed academic journal covering military history. It is published by Walter de Gruyter on behalf of the Center for Military History and Social Sciences of the Bundeswehr (formerly Military History Research Office, MGFA]) in Potsdam, Germany. 

It is a successor to the Militärgeschichtliche Mitteilungen (MGM) that was published from 1967 to 1998. The latter was already considered early on to be an "important interface between MGFA, university science and interested public".

References

External links 

Military history journals
German-language journals
Publications established in 1967
Bundeswehr